The World Rugby Men's 15s Player of the Year is an accolade awarded annually by World Rugby at the World Rugby Awards.  The award is presented to honour "the achievements of those involved at the highest level of the world game on the field".  The first World Rugby Player of the Year award was presented in 2001. 
It was called the IRB International Player of the Year; from 2007 until 2014 it was the IRB Player of the Year; in 2014 the award was titled the World Rugby Player of the Year before adopting its current name in 2016.   

The winner receives a trophy at an annual event awards ceremony.  The voting panel select a list of nominees who can then be voted for by players, coaches, media representatives and the public via Twitter.  Informed by the vote, the panel then select the winner.   the voting panel comprises John Smit, George Gregan, Melodie Robinson, Maggie Alphonsi, Clive Woodward, Brian O'Driscoll, Richie McCaw, Thierry Dusautoir and Fiona Coghlan.

The inaugural winner of the award was Irish hooker Keith Wood who is considered one of the greatest Ireland and British and Irish Lions players.  New Zealanders (also known as All Blacks) dominate the list of winners having received the award on ten occasions. Two players have won the award three times – flanker Richie McCaw (2006, 2009 and 2010) and fly-half Dan Carter (2005, 2012 and 2015). Nominations for the award are dominated by players from Tier 1 nations; only United States' Joe Taufete'e has ever been nominated from a Tier 2 side. Fly-half is the most successful position with seven wins, followed by flanker with five. The winner of the World Rugby Player of the Year for 2022 was Ireland's Josh van der Flier.

Winners and nominees

Statistics
Correct as of the 2022 award

By country

References

External links
 World Rugby Awards

Player
 
Awards established in 2001